The New England Preparatory School Athletic Council (NEPSAC) is an organization that serves as the governing body for sports in preparatory schools and leagues in New England. The organization has 169 full member schools as well as 24 associate member schools. The associate member schools are from New England as well as outside the region, including Indiana, New Jersey, New York, and Ontario. The organization is headquartered in Maine.

History
Although the relationships and rivalries between many of these schools began long before the 20th century, the New England Preparatory School Athletic Council was officially founded in 1942 as an organization of athletic directors from preparatory schools in New England also with two members from Lower Canada.

School representatives met at the Harvard Club outside of Boston to discuss the future of preparatory school athletics due to government regulations were imposed due to World War II.

Member schools
The following schools are members of the New England Preparatory School Athletic Council:

 Applewild School
 Avon Old Farms School
 Austin Preparatory School
 Bancroft School
 Beaver Country Day School
 Belmont Day School
 Belmont Hill School
 The Bement School
 Berkshire School
 Berwick Academy
 Boston Trinity Academy
 Boston University Academy
 Bradford Christian Academy
 Brewster Academy
 Bridgton Academy
 Brimmer and May School
 British International School of Boston
 Brooks School
 Brookwood School
 Brunswick School
 Buckingham Browne & Nichols School
 Cambridge Friends School
 Cambridge Montessori School
 The Cambridge School of Weston
 Canterbury School
 Cardigan Mountain School
 The Carroll School
 CATS Academy Boston
 Chapel Hill – Chauncy Hall School
 Charles River School
 Cheshire Academy
 Choate Rosemary Hall
 Christian Heritage School
 Commonwealth School
 Concord Academy
 Covenant Christian Academy
 Cushing Academy
 Dana Hall School
 Darrow School
 Dedham Country Day School
 Deerfield Academy
 Derby Academy
 Dexter Southfield School
 Dublin School
 Eaglebrook School
 Eagle Hill School
 Ethel Walker School
 Faith Christian Academy
 Fay School
 Fenn School
 Fessenden School
 Foote School
 Forman School
 The Frederick Gunn School
 Gann Academy
 Glen Urquhart School
 Gould Academy
 The Governor's Academy
 Greens Farms Academy
 Greenwich Academy
 Greenwich Country Day School
 Groton School
 Hamden Hall Country Day School
 The Harvey School
 Hebron Academy
 High Mowing School
 Hillside School
 Holderness School
 Hoosac School
 Hopkins School
 Hotchkiss School
 Hyde School
 Indian Mountain School
 Inly School
 International School of Boston
 Kent School
 Kents Hill School
 Kimball Union Academy
 King School
 Kingswood-Oxford School
 Landmark School
 Lawrence Academy
 The Learning Center for the Deaf
 Lexington Christian Academy
 Loomis Chaffee School
 MacDuffie School
 Marianapolis Preparatory School
 Marvelwood School
 Masters School
 The Master's School
 The Meadowbrook School of Weston
 Middlesex School
 Millbrook School
 Milton Academy
 Miss Hall's School
 Miss Porter's School
 Montrose School
 Nashoba Brooks School
 New Hampton School
 New York Military Academy
 The Newman School
 Newton Country Day School
 Noble and Greenough School
 Northfield Mount Hermon School
 Oakwood Friends School
 The Park School
 Phillips Academy
 Phillips Exeter Academy
 The Pike School
 Pingree School
 Pomfret School
 Portsmouth Abbey School
 Proctor Academy
 Providence Country Day School
 Rectory School
 Renbrook School
 Rivers School
 Rocky Hill School
 Roxbury Latin School
 Rumsey Hall School
 Rye Country Day School
 Sacred Heart Greenwich
 St. Andrew's School
 St. George's School
 St. Luke's School
 St. Mark's School
 St. Paul's School
 St. Sebastian's School
 St. Thomas More School
 Salisbury School
 School of the Holy Child
 Shady Hill School
 Shore Country Day School
 South Kent School
 Stoneleigh-Burnham School
 Storm King School
 Suffield Academy
 Tabor Academy
 Taft School
 Tenacre Country Day School
 Thayer Academy
 Tilton School
 Tower School
 Trinity-Pawling School
 Vermont Academy
 The Waldorf School
 Waring School
 Watkinson School
 Westminster School
 Westover School
 The Wheeler School
 White Mountain School
 Wilbraham & Monson Academy
 Williams Memorial Institute
 Williston Northampton School
 The Winchendon School
 Winsor School
 The Woodhall School
 Woodward School for Girls
 Wooster School
 Worcester Academy

Associate member schools

 Académie Saint-Louis
 Academy at Penguin Hall
 Albany Academy
 American School for the Deaf
 Bishop's College School
 Capitol Preparatory Harbor School
 Culver Academies
 EF International Academy
 The Hill School
 Kings-Edgehill School
 The Lawrenceville School
 Lee Academy
 Moses Brown School
 Nichols School
 North Yarmouth Academy
 Princeton Day School
 Redemption Christian Academy
 Springfield Commonwealth Academy
 St. Andrew's College
 Stanstead College
 The Woodstock Academy
 Wyoming Seminary

Leagues
The following leagues are composed of members of the New England Preparatory School Athletic Council:
 Eastern Independent League (EIL)
 Fairchester Athletic Association
 Founders League (FL)
 Girls Independent League (GIL)
 Housatonic Valley Athletic League (HVAL)
 Hudson Valley Athletic League (HVAL)
 Independent Girls Conference (IGC)
 Independent School League (ISL)
 Lakes Region League (LRL)
 Maine Association of Independent School Athletic Directors (MAISAD)
 Massachusetts Bay Independent League (MBIL) 
 Southeastern New England Independent Schools Athletic Association (SENEISAA)

References

External links
 

High school sports associations in the United States
New England
Preparatory schools in the United States
High school sports conferences and leagues in the United States
1942 establishments in the United States